The Empire Builder is an Amtrak long-distance passenger train that operates daily between Chicago and either Seattle or Portland via two sections west of Spokane. Introduced in 1929, it was the flagship passenger train of the Great Northern Railway and was retained by Amtrak when it took over intercity rail service in 1971.

It is Amtrak's busiest long-distance route.

During fiscal year 2022, the Empire Builder carried 303,568 passengers, an increase of 37.56% from FY2021 but 29.9% below pre-COVID-19 levels (433,372 passengers during FY2019). During FY2022, the train had a total revenue of $49,600,000.

History

The Great Northern Railway inaugurated the Empire Builder on June 10, 1929. It was named in honor of the company's founder, James J. Hill, who had reorganized several failing railroads into the only successful attempt at a privately funded transcontinental railroad. It reached the Pacific Northwest in the late 19th century, and for this feat, he was nicknamed "The Empire Builder". Following World War II, Great Northern placed new streamlined and diesel-powered trains in service that cut the scheduled 2,211-mile trip between Chicago and Seattle from 58.5 hours to 45 hours.

On May 27, 1931, the eastbound Empire Builder was struck by a tornado in Clay County, North Dakota. One passenger died, with 57 others injured.

The schedule allowed riders views of the Cascade Mountains and Glacier National Park, a park established through the lobbying efforts of the Great Northern. Re-equipped with domes in 1955, the Empire Builder offered passengers sweeping views of the route through three dome coaches and one full-length Great Dome car for first class passengers.

In 1970, the Great Northern merged with three other closely affiliated railroads to form the Burlington Northern Railroad, which assumed operation of the Builder.  Amtrak took over the train when it began operating most intercity routes a year later. To improve its farebox recovery ratio, Amtrak shifted the Chicago–St. Paul leg to run through Milwaukee via the Milwaukee Road. Before 1971, the Chicago–St. Paul leg used the Chicago, Burlington and Quincy Railroad's mainline along the Mississippi River through Wisconsin. The service also used to operate west from the Twin Cities before turning northwest in Willmar, Minnesota, to reach Fargo.

Amtrak added a Portland section in 1981, with the train splitting in Spokane. This restored service to the line previously operated by the Spokane, Portland and Seattle Railway. It was not the first time that the train had operated Seattle and Portland sections; Great Northern had split the Builder in Spokane for much of the 1940s and 1950s.

In 2005, Amtrak upgraded service to include a wine and cheese tasting in the dining car for sleeping car passengers and free newspapers in the morning.  Amtrak's inspector general eliminated some of these services in 2013 as part of a cost-saving measure.

During summer months, on portions of the route, "Trails and Rails" volunteer tour guides in the lounge car give commentary on points of visual and historic interest that can be viewed from the train.

After running daily for the better part of a century, the Empire Builder was cut back to tri-weekly operation along with most of Amtrak's other long-distance routes on October 12, 2020, as part of a round of service reductions due to the COVID-19 pandemic. For most of the fall and winter of 2020–21, trains departed Chicago on Mondays, Thursdays and Saturdays and departed Seattle or Portland on Tuesdays, Thursdays and Saturdays. However, in March 2021, Amtrak announced the train would return to its pre-pandemic daily schedule on May 24, 2021.

The westbound Empire Builder derailed near Joplin, Montana on September 25, 2021, with three fatalities.

Ridership
The Empire Builder is Amtrak's most popular long-distance train. Over fiscal years 2007–2016, Empire Builder annual ridership averaged 500,000, with a high of 554,266 in FY 2008. Revenue peaked in FY 2013 at $67,394,779. About 65% of the cost of operating the train is covered by fare revenue, a rate among Amtrak's long-distance trains second only to the specialized East Coast Auto Train.

Route

The current Amtrak Empire Builder passes through Oregon, Washington, Idaho, Montana, North Dakota, Minnesota, Wisconsin, and Illinois. It makes service stops in Spokane, Washington; Havre, Montana; Minot, North Dakota; and Saint Paul, Minnesota. Its other major stops include Vancouver, Washington; Whitefish, Montana; Williston, North Dakota; Fargo, North Dakota; and Milwaukee, Wisconsin. It uses BNSF Railway's Northern Transcon from Seattle to Minneapolis, Minnesota Commercial Railway from Minneapolis to St. Paul, the Canadian Pacific (former Milwaukee Road) from St. Paul to Rondout, Illinois, and Metra's Milwaukee District / North Line (former Milwaukee Road) from Rondout to Chicago. The St. Paul to Chicago portion currently follows the route of the former Twin Cities Hiawatha. In pre-Amtrak days it used the Twin Zephyrs routing.

The Seattle section uses the Cascade Tunnel and Stevens Pass as it traverses the Cascade Range to reach Spokane, while the Portland section runs along the Washington side of the Columbia River Gorge. The cars from the two sections are combined at Spokane. The combined train then traverses the mountains of northeastern Washington, northern Idaho and northwestern Montana, arriving in Whitefish in the morning. The schedule is timed so that the train passes through the Rocky Mountains (and Glacier National Park) during daylightan occurrence that is more likely on the eastbound train during summer.  Passengers can see sweeping views as the Builder travels along the middle fork of the Flathead River, crossing the Continental Divide at Marias Pass. After crossing Marias Pass, the Empire Builder leaves Glacier National Park and enters the Northern Plains of eastern Montana and North Dakota.

The land changes from prairie to forest as it travels through Minnesota. From Minneapolis-St. Paul, the Builder crosses the Mississippi River at Hastings, Minnesota and passes through southeastern Minnesota cities on or near Lake Pepin before crossing the Mississippi again at La Crosse, Wisconsin. It passes through rural southern Wisconsin, turns south at Milwaukee, and ends at Chicago Union Station.

The westbound Empire Builder leaves Chicago in early afternoon, arriving in Milwaukee just before the afternoon rush and in St. Paul in the evening. After traveling overnight through Minnesota, it spends most of the following day traveling through North Dakota and Montana, arriving at Glacier National Park in the early evening and splitting late at night in Spokane. The Seattle section travels through the Cascades overnight, arriving in Seattle in mid-morning. The Portland section arrives in the Tri-Cities just before breakfast and in Portland in mid-morning. The eastbound Seattle and Portland sections leave within five minutes of each other just before the afternoon rush, combining in Spokane and traveling through Montana overnight before arriving at Glacier National Park in mid-morning and Williston at dinner time. After traveling overnight through North Dakota and Minnesota, it arrives in St. Paul at breakfast time, Columbus/Madison at lunch time, Milwaukee in early afternoon and Chicago just before the afternoon rush.

Stops at Milwaukee Airport and Sturtevant were added beginning March 21, 2020 to replace Hiawatha Service trains suspended due to the COVID-19-related drastic drop in demand. Additionally, local travel was allowed between Chicago and Milwaukee. These adjustments lasted until the train resumed its normal schedule in May 2021.

Flooding

The line has come under threat from flooding from the Missouri, Souris, Red, and Mississippi Rivers, and has occasionally had to suspend or alter service. Most service gets restored in days or weeks, but Devils Lake in North Dakota, which has no natural outlet, is a long-standing threat. In spring 2011, the lake reached , causing service interruptions on windy days when high waves threatened the tracks.

BNSF, which owns the track, suspended freight operations through Devils Lake in 2009 and threatened to allow the rising waters to cover the line unless Amtrak could provide $100 million to raise the track.  In that case, the Empire Builder would have been rerouted to the south, ending service to Rugby, Devils Lake, and Grand Forks.  In June 2011 agreement was reached that Amtrak and BNSF would each cover 1/3 of the cost with the rest to come from the federal and state governments.

In December 2011, North Dakota was awarded a $10 million TIGER grant from the US Department of Transportation to assist with the state portion of the cost. Work began in June 2012, and the track is being raised in two stages: 5 feet in 2012, and another 5 feet in 2013. Two bridges and their abutments are also being raised. When the track raise is complete, the top-of-rail elevation will be .  This is 10 feet above the level at which the lake will naturally overflow and will thus be a permanent solution to the Devils Lake flooding.
In the spring and summer of 2011 flooding of the Souris River near Minot, North Dakota blocked the route in the latter part of June and for most of July. For some of that time the Empire Builder (with a typical consist of only four cars) ran from Chicago and terminated in Minneapolis/St Paul; to the west, the Empire Builder did not run east of Havre, Montana. (Other locations along the route also flooded, near Devils Lake, North Dakota and areas further west along the Missouri River.)

Freight train interference
An oil boom from the Bakken formation, combined with a robust fall 2013 harvest, led to a spike in the number of crude oil and grain trains using the Northern Transcon in Montana and North Dakota. The resulting congestion led to rampant delays for the Empire Builder, with the train running on time  44.5% in November 2013, the worst on-time performance of any Amtrak route and well below congressional standards. In some cases, the delays resulted in an imbalance of crew and equipment, forcing Amtrak to cancel runs of the Empire Builder. By May 2014, only 26% of Empire Builder trains had arrived within 30 minutes of their scheduled time, with delays averaging between 3 and 5 hours. In some cases, freight congestion and severe weather resulted in delays as long as 11 to 12 hours. This was a marked change from past years in which the Empire Builder was one of the best on-time performers in the entire Amtrak system, ahead of even the flagship Acela Express.

Due to the increasingly severe delays, Amtrak adjusted the route's schedule west of St. Paul on April 15, 2014. Westbound trains left St. Paul later, while eastbound trains left Seattle/Portland approximately three hours earlier.  Operating hours for affected stations were also officially adjusted accordingly.  The Amtrak announcement also said that the BNSF was working on adding track capacity, and it was anticipated that sometime in 2015 the Empire Builder could be returned to its former schedule.  In January 2015, it was announced that the train would resume its normal schedule.

Even during the worst of the delays, the train has seen frequent patronage from workers in the Bakken fields and their families who board and detrain in Williston. Passengers travel from as far as the Pacific Northwest.

Former stops

In 1970, the construction and filling of Lake Koocanusa necessitated the realignment of 60 miles of track between Stryker, Montana, and Libby, Montana, and the construction of Flathead Tunnel, leading the Empire Builder to drop service to Eureka, Montana. The Empire Builder also served Troy, Montana, until February 15, 1973.

On October 1, 1979, the Empire Builder was rerouted to operate over the North Coast Hiawatha'''s old route between Minneapolis and Fargo, North Dakota. With this alignment change, the Empire Builder dropped Willmar, Minnesota; Morris, Minnesota; and Breckenridge, Minnesota, while adding St. Cloud, Minnesota; Staples, Minnesota; and Detroit Lakes, Minnesota.

Another alignment change came on October 25, 1981, when the Seattle section was rerouted from the old Northern Pacific (which had also become part of the BN in 1970) to the Burlington Northern Railroad's line through the Cascade Tunnel over Stevens Pass. This change eliminated service to Yakima, Washington, Ellensburg, Washington, and Auburn, Washington. This change also introduced the Portland section, which returned service to the former Spokane, Portland and Seattle Railroad line (which became part of BN in 1970) along the Washington shore of the Columbia River. The route kept Pasco, but added Wishram, Bingen-White Salmon, and Vancouver (all in Washington) to the route. From Vancouver, the Portland section of the Empire Builder uses the same route as the Coast Starlight and Cascades trains to Portland Union Station.

It has been proposed that the Empire Builder and Hiawatha Service trains servicing Glenview, Illinois have their station stop be shifted one station north to the Metra station at North Glenview, to eliminate stops which block traffic on Glenview Road. North Glenview would have to be modified to handle additional traffic, and the move depends on commitments from Glenview, the Illinois General Assembly, and Metra.  In Minnesota, the Empire Builder returned to Saint Paul Union Depot on May 7, 2014, 43 years after it last served the station the day before the start of Amtrak. Renovation of the 1917 Beaux Arts terminal was undertaken in 2011, continuing through 2013, resulting in a multi-mode terminal used by Jefferson Lines, Greyhound Lines, commuter bus and the Metro Green Line, providing a light rail connection to downtown Minneapolis. The station replaced Midway Station which opened in 1978 after the initial abandonment of Saint Paul Union Depot in 1971 and the demolition of Minneapolis Great Northern Depot in 1978.

Equipment
Current equipment

Like all long-distance trains west of the Mississippi River, the Empire Builder uses bilevel Superliner passenger cars.  The Empire Builder was the first train to be fully equipped with Superliners, with the first run occurring on October 28, 1979. In Summer, 2005 the train was "re-launched" with newly refurbished equipment.

A typical Empire Builder consist is configured as follows (with the assigned section west of Spokane shown in parentheses):
Two or three GE Genesis or Siemens Charger ALC-42 locomotives
 Viewliner baggage car (Seattle)
 Transitional Crew Sleeper (Seattle)
 Sleeper (Seattle)
 Sleeper (Seattle)
 Diner (Seattle)
 Coach (Seattle)
 Coach (Seattle)
 Sightseer Lounge/Café (Portland)
 Coach/Baggage (Portland)
 Coach (Portland)
 Sleeper (Portland)
 Coach (Chicago–St. Paul)
In Spokane, the westbound train is split: the locomotives, baggage car, and first six-passenger cars (including the diner) continue on to Seattle as train 7, while a single P42 locomotive from Spokane is used to take the rearmost five cars (including the lounge/cafe) to Portland as train 27. Eastbound the sections are combined in a reverse fashion, with the Seattle section numbered as train 8 and the Portland section as train 28.

During peak travel periods, an additional coach is added to the rear of the train between Chicago and St. Paul. It is left overnight in St. Paul for the next day's return trip to pick up.  This car is designated train 807 westbound and train 808 eastbound.

Amtrak’s Siemens Charger ALC-42 locomotives were first used in revenue service on the Empire Builder on February 8, 2022.

Historical equipment

When first launched in 1929, the Great Northern provided new heavyweight consists. When the railway received five new streamlined trainsets in 1947, the old heavyweight sets were used to reintroduce the Oriental Limited. In 1951 the Empire Builder was re-equipped with six new streamlined trainsets;  the 1947 cars were used to launch the Western Star, while the Oriental Limited was retired. When the GN acquired dome coaches in 1955, the 1951 coaches went to Western Star, while the 1947 coaches went to the pool of spare and extra-movement cars. Ownership of the cars on the Empire Builder'' was by-and-large split between the Great Northern and the Chicago, Burlington and Quincy Railroad (CB&Q), though a couple of cars in the original consists were owned by the Spokane, Portland and Seattle Railway (SP&S).  In this consist, one of the 48-seat "chair" cars and one of the 4-section sleepers were used for the connection to Portland, while the rest of the consist connected to Seattle.

The Great Northern coaches eventually found their way into state-subsidized commuter service for the Central Railroad of New Jersey after the Burlington Northern merger and remained until 1987 when NJ Transit retired its last E8A locomotive. Some of these cars remain in New Jersey. Some coaches were acquired from the Union Pacific; these also went to New Jersey. One of the 28 seat coach-dinette cars also remains in New Jersey and is stored near Interstate 78 wearing tattered Amtrak colors.

Notes

Footnotes

References

Further reading

External links

Amtrak routes
Passenger trains of the Great Northern Railway (U.S.)
North American streamliner trains
Passenger rail transportation in Illinois
Passenger rail transportation in Wisconsin
Passenger rail transportation in Minnesota
Passenger rail transportation in North Dakota
Passenger rail transportation in Montana
Passenger rail transportation in Idaho
Passenger rail transportation in Oregon
Passenger rail transportation in Washington (state)
Railway services introduced in 1929
Night trains of the United States
Long distance Amtrak routes